"Se Quiere, Se Mata" (English: What Is Wanted, Is Killed) is the sixth single released from Shakira's third studio album, Pies Descalzos (1995). Written and composed by herself, "Se Quiere, Se Mata" was a Top Ten Hit in Mexico and on the Billboard Hot Latin Tracks in the United States. The song laments the story of a young couple, Braulio and Dana, and their choice to have an abortion. Introduced as an innocent young couple well liked by their families, the two succumb to their sexual desires, and Dana becomes pregnant.  However, rather than admit this to their families and neighbors, they choose to get an abortion.  The abortion ultimately goes badly, resulting in Dana's death.

The song title comes from the line "...esta podrida ciudad donde lo que no se quiere se mata." (... this rotten city where what is not wanted is killed,) where Shakira laments the moralistic societal pressure that drives people to take drastic measures to keep the appearances. Note that the Spanish word "quiere" may mean either "want" or "love" and the song seems to use both meanings.

Background and composition
In 1990, a thirteen-year-old Shakira signed a recording contract with Sony Music and released her debut studio album Magia in 1991, which largely consisted of tracks she had written since she was eight years old. Commercially, the project struggled, selling an underwhelming 1,200 copies in her native Colombia. Her follow-up record Peligro was released in 1993, and suffered a similar failure. Consequently, Shakira took a two-year hiatus, allowing her to complete her high school education.

Looking to revive her struggling career, Shakira released her first major-label studio album Pies Descalzos in 1996 by Sony Music and Columbia Records.  Assuming a prominent position in its production, she co-wrote and co-produced each of the eleven tracks included on the record.

Music video
The music video was directed by Juan Carlos Martín, and reached number one on the Telehit Top 25. Current leader of the Mexican band Zoé León Larregui appears in this video, as Braulio. The video shows Shakira telling the story of Braulio and Dana; as the song goes on, there are shots of her in a short room, with a black dress, and others where she wears a red dress, in a green room covered with papers, most probably referencing the social rules. In the video, it shows in a censored way, how Braulio and Dana succumb to their sexual desires, and also a short scene of "The Doctor" who Dana goes to abort her unborn baby while Braulio is shown waiting alone in a small restroom, trying to cope with his feelings.

Charts

See also
List of Billboard Latin Pop Airplay number ones of 1997

References

1996 singles
Shakira songs
Spanish-language songs
Songs written by Shakira
Songs about abortion
Songs about death
Songs written by Luis Fernando Ochoa
1995 songs
Columbia Records singles
Sony Music singles